Christian country music (sometimes marketed as country gospel, gospel country, positive country or inspirational country) is music that is written to express either personal or a communal belief regarding Christian life, as well as (in terms of the varying music styles) to give a Christian alternative to mainstream secular music. Christian country music is a form of Christian music and a subgenre of both Gospel music and Country music.

Like other forms of music the creation, performance, significance, and even the definition of Christian country music varies according to culture and social context. It is composed and performed for many purposes, ranging from aesthetic pleasure, religious or ceremonial purposes with a positive message, or as an entertainment product for the marketplace. However, a common theme as with most Christian music is praise, worship or thanks to God and/or Christ.

Organizations
Many Christian country organizations have been around for a great number of years. The oldest of all of these organizations is the International Country Gospel Music Association which was founded in 1957. These organizations were founded to further artists careers much in the same manner as the GMA, NARAS or CMA. Many of these organizations have yearly conventions which hosts music showcases and awards shows. The CCMA was sued by the CMA for award name right infringement. The CCMA renamed their awards show after a federal judge ruled that they could no longer use the name. The new name is the ICM Music Awards' which stands for "Inspirational Country Music".

Radio
Radio personality Bob Wilson was one of the first radio personalities to see the potential of the genre. His weekly show Gospel Country Round-up aired for many years playing southern and Christian country music. Many Christian country stations today are going the way of Internet stations. That is a positive move for this genre, however, because there are few terrestrial radio stations that play a strictly Christian country format. Many mainstream country stations only have a weekly Sunday Country Gospel show.

Christian country has several syndicated programs. The Country Gospel Countdown has broadcast since 1984 and syndicated since 1988, The Country Parson radio program with host Scott Perkins, broadcast since 1995 and has been syndicated since 1998. Today's Cross Country with Marty Smith, broadcast since 1995, syndicated since 1996. Ken's Country Radio Show, The Radio Hour, Country Messenger, The Ranch radio show on KKUS, and Canadian produced Riverside Country. The Country Gospel Music Guild also airs a weekly radio program while Circuit Rider Radio airs on conventional and satellite radio worldwide.

Other syndicated weekend shows that feature Inspirational and Positive Country music are Power Source Top 20, and finally, the American Christian Music Review for United Stations Radio Networks. These programs are aired nationwide weekly on both Country and Southern Gospel radio stations.

AM/FM and Internet stations that play Christian Country Music, 90.5 KJIC Christian Country Radio, CBN Cross Country, HLE Radio, Heaven's Country, 89.9 Today's Christian Country.

Artists
Many secular country music artists have recorded country gospel songs or have performed them on their radio and television programs.  From 1956-1960, two network shows usually concluded with a gospel number, which was popular with viewers: The Tennessee Ernie Ford Show and Red Foley's Ozark Jubilee.

Other shows like Hee Haw, the Barbara Mandrell and the Mandrell Sisters Show, and the Statler Brothers implemented the same programming style. For instance, Hee Haw featured a gospel song at the end of each of its shows; series stars Roy Clark, Buck Owens, Grandpa Jones and Kenny Price would sing either a traditional hymn or a newer one well known by mainstream country and Christian country audiences, and the segment itself served as a balance to the show's loony, corn-style humor.

The Grand Ole Opry, the longest running radio show and one of the most popular country music shows, has always included gospel music as a part of its program.

In the past, most Christian country music was recorded by groups with southern gospel flair like the Oak Ridge Boys, Mercy River Boys, The Cook Family Singers, Red Sovine, The Louvin Brothers and The Carter Family. Eventually, more mainstream country artists—ranging from Loretta Lynn and Dolly Parton to Alabama and Alan Jackson—recorded gospel albums while continuing to record secular music. Johnny Cash, a devout Christian despite living a troubled life, recorded several best-selling gospel albums and always included a Christian song in his concerts. Ray Stevens, a musician known primarily for his comedy and novelty recordings, also recorded an album of Christian music and mixed Christian themes in his serious ("Everything is Beautiful," stressing unity) and novelty (for instance, "Mississippi Squirrel Revival," which had a theme of repentance) mainstream releases.

Although The Oak Ridge Boys began releasing secular country songs in the late 1970s, they always maintained their gospel roots by recording religious material and performing gospel songs in their concerts, as well as releasing songs stressing Christian values and family unity. The Mercy River Boys released their debut album, Breakout (Canaan Records) in 1979, firmly establishing the new Christian Country genre. Don Cusic (Billboard Magazine, Vol. 90, No 31), credits Canaan Records for creating a band to crossover into country music, improving “what is essentially a good product (gospel) and made it become commercially viable.” The Mercy River Boys charted hits in Country, Southern Gospel and on traditional Gospel formats. Other gospel groups followed the Oak Ridge Boys and the Mercy River Boys into Christian Country music.

At times, gospel and Christian-themed songs earned mass mainstream appeal. Among the most popular of these songs included "Why Me" by Kris Kristofferson (1973, a plea for God's guidance and forgiveness), "The Seeker" by Dolly Parton (1975, a spiritual), "One Day at a Time" by Cristy Lane (1980, co-written by Kristofferson), "Three Wooden Crosses" by Randy Travis (2003, where a prostitute gives birth to a man who eventually becomes a preacher), "Long Black Train" by Josh Turner (2003, about resisting temptation from Satan and following the Lord instead); "Jesus, Take the Wheel" by Carrie Underwood (2005, where a woman turns to Christ) and "When I Get Where I'm Going" by Brad Paisley (2006, about the afterlife).

Christian country magazines
Christian Music Weekly (formerly CCRB) since 1990
Power Source Magazine
Circuit Rider Magazine
Christian Country Gospel News
Super Christian Country
Singing News magazine

See also 
 List of Christian country artists

References 

 
Gospel music genres
Country music genres
Radio formats

de:Country-Gospel